WYBK (89.7 FM) is a non-commercial radio station broadcasting a Christian radio format. Licensed to Chattanooga, Tennessee, United States, the station serves the Chattanooga area and south-central Tennessee.  The station is currently owned by the Bible Broadcasting Network.

History
For many years, FM 89.7 was the frequency for WDYN, owned by Tennessee Temple University of Chattanooga, Tennessee. WDYN began as the campus station for the then-Tennessee Temple College in 1968. In November 2010, Tennessee Temple sold the station's transmitters and frequency to Bible Broadcasting Network for $2.5 million as WYBK. The school retained the studio facilities, and continued to broadcast on the internet. The school subsequently purchased WUUS (AM 980) from 3 Daughters Media for $175,000, and began broadcasting its signal on that frequency on December 4, 2010.

References

External links

Bible Broadcasting Network
YBK